Ralph Eliot Howe III (born 12 May 1941) is an American hardball squash player. He was one of the leading squash players in the United States in the 1960s and 1970s.

Howe won the US national junior title in 1960. He then went on to win the intercollegiate title in 1962 and 1963 while at Yale University.

In 1964, Howe beat three former national champions on his way to winning the US national singles title. Howe also won the US national doubles title six times between 1965 and 1976.

In 1967, Howe won the United States Open. He defeated three-time defending-champion Mo Khan in the semi-finals, before going on to beat his older brother Sam Howe in the final, to become one of only four amateurs ever to win the most prestigious open tournament on the North American continent.

Ralph was inducted into the United States Squash Racquets Association Hall of Fame in 2002.

References

American male squash players
Yale University alumni
1941 births
Living people
Place of birth missing (living people)
American male tennis players